Brélidy is a commune in the Côtes-d'Armor department of Brittany in northwestern France.

Population

Inhabitants of Brélidy are called Brélidiens in French.

See also
Communes of the Côtes-d'Armor department

References

External links

Communes of Côtes-d'Armor